Uber Technologies, Inc. (Uber), based in San Francisco, provides  mobility as a service/ride-hailing (48% of revenues), food delivery/package delivery/couriers via Uber Eats and Postmates (34% of revenues), and freight transport (18% of revenues). Uber sets fares, which vary using a dynamic pricing model based on local supply and demand at the time of the booking and are quoted to the customer in advance, and receives a commission from each booking. It has operations in approximately 70 countries and 10,500 cities and, with 131 million monthly active users and 5.4 million active drivers and couriers worldwide, it generates an average of 23 million trips per day.

Like other ridesharing companies, Uber classifies its drivers as gig workers and independent contractors, where allowable, which is the subject of legal action in several jurisdictions. Ridesharing companies have disrupted taxicab businesses and allegedly caused an increase in traffic congestion. Ridesharing companies are regulated in many jurisdictions and the Uber platform is not available in several countries where the company is not able or willing to comply with regulations. Controversies involving Uber include various unethical practices such as aggressive lobbying and ignoring and evading local regulations. Many of these were revealed by a leak of documents showing controversial activity between 2013 and 2017 under the leadership of Travis Kalanick.

History

In 2009, Garrett Camp, a co-founder of StumbleUpon, came up with the idea to create Uber to make it easier and cheaper to procure direct transportation. Camp and Travis Kalanick had spent $800 hiring a private driver on New Year's Eve, which they deemed excessive, and Camp was also inspired by his difficulty in finding a taxi on a snowy night in Paris. The prototype of the mobile app was built by Camp and his friends, Oscar Salazar and Conrad Whelan, with Kalanick as the "mega advisor" to the company.

In February 2010, Ryan Graves became the first Uber employee; he was named chief executive officer (CEO) in May 2010. In December 2010, Kalanick succeeded Graves as CEO and Graves became the chief operating officer.

Following a beta launch in May 2010, Uber's services and mobile app launched publicly in San Francisco in 2011. Originally, the application only allowed users to hail a black luxury car and the price was approximately 1.5 times that of a taxi. In 2011, the company changed its name from UberCab to Uber after complaints from San Francisco taxicab operators.

The company's early hires included a nuclear physicist, a computational neuroscientist, and a machinery expert who worked on predicting arrival times for Uber's cars more accurately than Google APIs. In April 2012, Uber launched a service in Chicago, whereby users were able to request a regular taxi or an Uber driver via its mobile app.

In July 2012, the company introduced UberX, a cheaper option that allowed drivers to use non-luxury vehicles, including their personal vehicles, subject to a background check, insurance, registration, and vehicle standards. By December 2013, the service was operating in 65 cities.

In December 2013, USA Today named Uber its tech company of the year.

In August 2014, Uber launched a shared transport service in the San Francisco Bay Area and launched Uber Eats, a food delivery service.

In August 2016, facing tough competition, Uber sold its operations in China to DiDi in exchange for an 18% stake in DiDi. DiDi agreed to invest $1 billion in Uber. Uber had started operations in China in 2014, under the name 优步 (Yōubù).

In 2016, Uber acquired Ottomotto, a self-driving truck company founded by Anthony Levandowski, for $625 million. Levandowski, previously employed by Waymo, allegedly founded Ottomotto using trade secrets he stole from Waymo. Uber settled a lawsuit regarding the use of such intellectual property and reached a deal to use Waymo's technology for its freight transport operations.

In December 2016, Uber acquired Geometric Intelligence. Geometric Intelligence's 15 person staff formed the initial core of "Uber AI", a division for researching AI technologies and machine learning. Uber AI created multiple open source projects, such as Pyro, Ludwig, and Plato. Uber AI also developed new AI techniques and algorithms, such as the POET algorithm and a sequence of papers on neuroevolution. Uber AI was shut down in May 2020.

In August 2017, Dara Khosrowshahi, the former CEO of Expedia Group, replaced Kalanick as CEO.

In February 2018, Uber combined its operations in Russia, Armenia, Azerbaijan, Belarus, Georgia and Kazakhstan with those of Yandex.Taxi and invested $225 million in the venture. In March 2018, Uber merged its services in Southeast Asia with those of Grab in exchange for a 27.5% ownership stake in Grab.

Between May 2018 and November 2018, Uber offered Uber Rent powered by Getaround, a peer-to-peer carsharing service available to some users in San Francisco.

In November 2018, Uber became a gold member of the Linux Foundation.

On May 10, 2019, Uber became a public company via an initial public offering.

In the summer of 2019, Uber announced layoffs of 8% of its staff and eliminated the position of  COO Barney Harford.

In October 2019, in partnership with HeliFlight, Uber offered 8-minute helicopter flights between Manhattan and John F. Kennedy International Airport for $200-$225 per passenger.

Between October 2019 and May 2020, Uber offered Uber Works, a mobile app connecting workers who wanted temporary jobs with businesses in Chicago and Miami.

In January 2020, Uber acquired Careem for $3.1 billion and sold its Indian Uber Eats operations to Zomato.

Also in January 2020, Uber tested a feature that enabled drivers at the Santa Barbara, Sacramento, and Palm Springs airports to set fares based on a multiple of Uber's rates.

In May 2020, during the COVID-19 pandemic, Uber announced layoffs of over 14% of its workforce.

In June 2020, in its first software as a service partnership, Uber announced that it would manage the on-demand high-occupancy vehicle fleet for Marin Transit, a public bus agency in Marin County, California.

In July 2020, Uber, in partnership with its majority-owned Cornershop, launched Uber grocery delivery service in Latin America, Canada, Miami, and Dallas.

In September 2020, Uber committed to carbon neutrality globally by 2040, and required that, by 2030, in most countries, rides must be offered exclusively in electric vehicles.

In December 2020, Uber acquired Postmates for $2.65 billion.

Also in December 2020, Uber sold its Elevate division, which was developing short flights using VTOL aircraft, to Joby Aviation.

In January 2021, Uber ATG/Advanced Technologies Group, a joint venture minority-owned by SoftBank Vision Fund, Toyota, and Denso that was developing self-driving cars, was sold to Aurora Innovation for $4 billion in equity and Uber invested $400 million into Aurora.

In March 2021, the company moved to a new headquarters on Third Street in  Mission Bay, San Francisco, consisting of several 6- and 11-story buildings connected by bridges and walkways.

In October 2021, Uber acquired Drizly, an alcohol delivery service, for $1.1 billion in cash and stock.

On January 20, 2022, Uber acquired Australian car-sharing company Car Next Door.

In May 2022, Uber began operations in Italy, forming a partnership with IT Taxi, Italy's largest taxi dispatcher, to integrate the dispatcher's drivers with the Uber platform. Uber had previously done similar deals in Spain, Germany, Austria, Turkey, South Korea, Hong Kong, and New York.

On September 15, 2022, Uber discovered a security breach of its internal network by a hacker that utilized social engineering to obtain an employee's credentials and gain access to the company's VPN and intranet. The company said that no sensitive data had been compromised.

Finances

Uber has posted hundreds of millions or billions of dollars in losses each year since 2014 except for 2018, when it exited from the markets in Russia, China, and Southeast Asia in exchange for stakes in rival businesses. Uber had 32.11 billion USD worth of assets, 24.03 billion USD in liabilities, and 32,800 employees in 2022.

Controversies

Ignoring and evading local regulations
Uber has been criticized for its strategy of generally commencing operations in a city without regard for local regulations. If faced with regulatory opposition, Uber called for public support for its service and mounted a political campaign, supported by lobbying, to change regulations. Uber argued that it is "a technology company" and not a taxi company, and therefore it was not subject to regulations affecting taxi companies. Uber's strategy was generally to "seek forgiveness rather than permission". In 2014, with regards to airport pickups without a permit in California, drivers were actually told to ignore local regulations and that the company would pay for any citations. Uber's response to California Assembly Bill 5 (2019), whereby it announced that it would not comply with the law, then engaged lobbyists and mounted an expensive public opinion campaign to overturn it via a ballot, was cited as an example of this policy.  Taxi companies sued Uber in numerous American cities, alleging that Uber's policy of violating taxi regulations was a form of unfair competition or a violation of antitrust law. Although some courts did find that Uber intentionally violated the taxi rules, Uber prevailed in every case, including the only case to proceed to trial.

In March 2017, an investigation by The New York Times revealed that Uber developed a software tool called "Greyball" to avoid giving rides to known law enforcement officers in areas where its service was illegal such as in Portland, Oregon, Australia, South Korea, and China. The tool identified government officials using geofencing, mining credit card databases, identifying devices, and searches of social media. While at first, Uber stated that it only used the tool to identify riders that violated its terms of service, after investigations by Portland, Oregon, and the United States Department of Justice, Uber admitted to using the tool to skirt local regulations and promised not to use the tool for that purpose. The use of Greyball in London was cited by Transport for London as one of the reasons for its decision not to renew Uber's private hire operator licence in September 2017.  A January 2018 report by Bloomberg News stated that Uber routinely used a "panic button" system, codenamed "Ripley", that locked, powered off and changed passwords on staff computers when those offices were subjected to government raids. Uber allegedly used this button at least 24 times, from spring 2015 until late 2016.

Counter-intelligence research on class action plaintiffs
In 2016 Uber hired the global security consulting firm Ergo to secretly investigate plaintiffs involved in a class action lawsuit. Ergo operatives posed as acquaintances of the plaintiff's counsel and tried to contact their associates to obtain information that could be used against them. The result of which was found out causing the judge to throw out evidence obtained as obtained in a  fraudulent manner.

Sexual harassment allegations and management shakeup (2017)
On February 19, 2017, former Uber engineer Susan Fowler published on her website that she was propositioned for sex by a manager and subsequently threatened with termination of employment by another manager if she continued to report the incident. Kalanick was alleged to have been aware of the complaint. On February 27, 2017, Amit Singhal, Uber's Senior Vice President of Engineering, was forced to resign after he failed to disclose a sexual harassment claim against him that occurred while he served as Vice President of Google Search. After investigations led by former attorney general Eric Holder and Arianna Huffington, a member of Uber's board of directors, in June 2017, Uber fired over 20 employees. Kalanick took an indefinite leave of absence but, under pressure from investors, he resigned as CEO a week later. Also departing the company in June 2017 was Emil Michael, a senior vice president who suggested that Uber hire a team of opposition researchers and journalists, with a million-dollar budget, to "dig up dirt" on the personal lives and backgrounds of journalists who reported negatively on Uber, specifically targeting Sarah Lacy, editor of PandoDaily, who, in an article published in October 2014, accused Uber of sexism and misogyny in its advertising. In August 2018, Uber agreed to pay a total of $7 million to settle claims of gender discrimination, harassment, and hostile work environment, with 480 employees and former employees receiving $10,700 each and 56 of those employees and former employees receiving an additional $33,900 each. In December 2019, Kalanick resigned from the board of directors of the company and sold his shares.

Delayed disclosure of data breaches
On February 27, 2015, Uber admitted that it had suffered a data breach more than nine months prior. Names and license plate information from approximately 50,000 drivers were inadvertently disclosed. Uber discovered this leak in September 2014, but waited more than five months to notify the affected individuals.

An announcement in November 2017 revealed that in 2016, a separate data breach had disclosed the personal information of 600,000 drivers and 57 million customers. This data included names, email addresses, phone numbers, and drivers' license information. Hackers used employees' usernames and passwords that had been compromised in previous breaches (a "credential stuffing" method) to gain access to a private GitHub repository used by Uber's developers. The hackers located credentials for the company's Amazon Web Services datastore in the repository files, and were able to obtain access to the account records of users and drivers, as well as other data contained in over 100 Amazon S3 buckets. Uber paid a $100,000 ransom to the hackers on the promise they would delete the stolen data. Uber was subsequently criticized for concealing this data breach. Khosrowshahi publicly apologized. In September 2018, in the largest multi-state settlement of a data breach, Uber paid $148 million to the Federal Trade Commission, admitted that its claim that internal access to consumers' personal information was closely monitored on an ongoing basis was false, and stated that it had failed to live up to its promise to provide reasonable security for consumer data. Also in November 2018, Uber's British divisions were fined £385,000 (reduced to £308,000) by the Information Commissioner's Office.

In 2020, the US Department of Justice announced criminal charges against former Chief Security Officer Joe Sullivan for obstruction of justice. The criminal complaint said Sullivan arranged, with Kalanick's knowledge, to pay a ransom for the 2016 breach as a "bug bounty" to conceal its true nature, and for the hackers to falsify non-disclosure agreements to say they had not obtained any data.

Privacy
In July 2017, Uber received a five-star privacy rating from the Electronic Frontier Foundation, but was harshly criticised by the group in September 2017 for a controversial policy of tracking customers' locations even after a ride ended, forcing the company to reverse its policy.

2022 leak documenting misdeeds

More than 124,000 Uber documents covering the five-year period from 2012 to 2017 when Uber was run by its co-founder Travis Kalanick were leaked by Mark MacGann, a lobbyist who "led Uber's efforts to win over governments across Europe, the Middle East and Africa", to The Guardian newspaper and first printed on 10 July 2022 by its Sunday sister The Observer. The documents revealed attempts to lobby Joe Biden, Olaf Scholz and George Osborne; how Emmanuel Macron secretly aided Uber lobbying in France, and use of a kill switch during police raids to conceal data. Kalanick dismissed concerns from other executives that sending Uber drivers to a protest in France put them at risk of violence from angry opponents in the taxi industry, saying "I think it's worth it, violence guarantees success".

References

Further reading
Scholarly papers
 
 
 
 
 
 

Books
 Isaac, Mike (2019). Super Pumped: The Battle for Uber. New York. . 
 

Articles
 The Uber whistleblower: I’m exposing a system that sold people a lie. The Guardian. July 11, 2022.

Further viewing
 Playing by the Rules: Ethics at Work: Season 3 Episode 1: "Driven" PBS

External links

 

 
2009 establishments in California
2019 initial public offerings
American brands
American companies established in 2009
Companies based in San Francisco
Location-based software
Companies listed on the New York Stock Exchange
Ridesharing companies of the United States
Transport companies established in 2009
Transport Network Companies